Calylophus lavandulifolius (lavender leaf sundrops, formerly Oenothera lavandulifolia) is a low-growing perennial plant in the evening primrose family found in the Colorado Plateau and Canyonlands region of the southwestern United States.

Inflorescence and fruit
From May to July it blooms with striking yellow flowers that fade to shades of orange or lavender as the flower dries up.

Habitat and range

References

Onagraceae
Flora of the Northwestern United States
Flora of the United States
Flora of the South-Central United States
Flora of the Southwestern United States
Flora of the Colorado Plateau and Canyonlands region
Flora of the Great Plains (North America)
Taxa named by Asa Gray
Taxa named by John Torrey